Saltsburg Historic District is a national historic district located at Saltsburg in Indiana County, Pennsylvania.  The district includes 118 contributing buildings, 1 contributing site, 1 contributing structure, and 15 contributing objects in the central business district and surrounding residential areas of Saltsburg. The district includes notable examples of buildings in the Federal and Late Victorian styles. Most of the buildings were built between the 1830s and 1880s. Notable buildings include the William McIlwaine House and Store (1820–1829), Dr. James Crawford House (1830–1839), Dr. McFarland's Drug Store and Office (1840), Saltsburg Hotel (1870s), Western Pennsylvania Railroad Station (1864), Saltsburg Presbyterian Church (1874), Sons of Zebedee Evangelical Lutheran Church (1878), Altman Feed Mill (1893), First National Bank Building (1927), DeLisi Theater (1923).  The contributing site is former canal / railbed of the Western Pennsylvania Railroad and Lock #8, now occupied by Canal Park.  The contributing structure are the retaining walls of the railroad.  The contributing objects are canal markers.

It was listed on the National Register of Historic Places in 1992.

References

External links
Town of Saltsburg, Saltsburg, Indiana, PA: 8 photos, 31 data pages, and 1 photo caption page at Historic American Buildings Survey
Mathias Rombach House, 321 Basin Street, Saltsburg, Indiana, PA: 3 photos, 7 data pages, and 1 photo caption page at Historic American Buildings Survey
First National Bank of Saltsburg, 214 Point Street, Saltsburg, Indiana, PA: 3 photos, 7 data pages, and 1 photo caption page at Historic American Buildings Survey
Saltsburg Academy, High & Point Streets, Saltsburg, Indiana, PA: 3 photos, 7 data pages, and 1 photo caption page at Historic American Buildings Survey
Saltsburg Mule Barn, 114 Point Street, Saltsburg, Indiana, PA: 6 drawings and 1 data page at Historic American Buildings Survey
Robert J. Taylor House, 211 Point Street, Saltsburg, Indiana, PA: 5 photos, 7 data pages, and 1 photo caption page at Historic American Buildings Survey
William McIlwaine House, 241 Washington Street, Saltsburg, Indiana, PA: 1 photo, 7 data pages, and 1 photo caption page at Historic American Buildings Survey
Dr. John McFarland House, 216 Washington Street, Saltsburg, Indiana, PA: 1 photo, 6 data pages, and 1 photo caption page at Historic American Buildings Survey
St. Matthew's Catholic Church, Cathedral Street, Saltsburg, Indiana, PA: 4 photos, 7 data pages, and 1 photo caption page at Historic American Buildings Survey
Dr. Thomas Murray House, 101 Point Street, Saltsburg, Indiana, PA: 2 photos, 7 data pages, and 1 photo caption page at Historic American Buildings Survey
105 Point Street (House), Saltsburg, Indiana, PA: 3 photos, 7 data pages, and 1 photo caption page at Historic American Buildings Survey
Wray House, 500 Market Street, Saltsburg, Indiana, PA: 4 photos, 7 data pages, and 1 photo caption page at Historic American Buildings Survey
Thomas & John Robinson House, 711 Water Street, Saltsburg, Indiana, PA: 3 photos, 7 data pages, and 1 photo caption page at Historic American Buildings Survey
United Presbyterian Church, High Street & Ash Alley, Saltsburg, Indiana, PA: 1 photo, 7 data pages, and 1 photo caption page at Historic American Buildings Survey
Pennsylvania Railroad Station, Point Street, Saltsburg, Indiana, PA: 2 photos, 7 data pages, and 1 photo caption page at Historic American Buildings Survey
Patterson Milling Company, Feed Mill, Water & Point Streets, Saltsburg, Indiana, PA: 11 drawings, 14 photos, 2 data pages, 3 photo caption pages, and 2 color transparencies at Historic American Buildings Survey
William Stewart House, 232 Point Street, Saltsburg, Indiana, PA: 19 data pages at Historic American Buildings Survey
William C. Robinson House, 103 Point Street, Saltsburg, Indiana, PA: 1 photo, 7 data pages, and 1 photo caption page at Historic American Buildings Survey
Samuel S. Moore House & Store, 222 Point Street, Saltsburg, Indiana, PA: 2 photos, 7 data pages, and 1 photo caption page at Historic American Buildings Survey
John Martin House, 502 High Street, Saltsburg, Indiana, PA: 7 photos, 7 data pages, and 1 photo caption page at Historic American Buildings Survey
Andrew Andre House, 821 High Street, Saltsburg, Indiana, PA: 3 photos, 7 data pages, and 1 photo caption page at Historic American Buildings Survey
James Robinson House, 425 Salt Street, Saltsburg, Indiana, PA: 2 photos, 7 data pages, and 1 photo caption page at Historic American Buildings Survey
James McGlaughlin House, 803 Water Street, Saltsburg, Indiana, PA: 2 photos, 8 data pages, and 1 photo caption page at Historic American Buildings Survey
P. D. Shupe Hardware Store, 202 Point Street, Saltsburg, Indiana, PA: 9 photos, 8 data pages, and 1 photo caption page at Historic American Buildings Survey
Sons of Zebedee Evangelical Lutheran Church, 422 Salt Street, Saltsburg, Indiana, PA: 6 photos, 7 data pages, and 1 photo caption page at Historic American Buildings Survey
706-08 Salt Street (House), Saltsburg, Indiana, PA: 3 photos, 1 data page, and 1 photo caption page at Historic American Buildings Survey

Historic districts on the National Register of Historic Places in Pennsylvania
Federal architecture in Pennsylvania
Buildings and structures in Indiana County, Pennsylvania
National Register of Historic Places in Indiana County, Pennsylvania